Fools is a 1970 drama film directed by Tom Gries. It stars Katharine Ross and Jason Robards.

Plot
Aging actor Matthew South falls in love with a much younger married woman, the wife of his attorney.

Cast
Katharine Ross as Anais Appleton
Jason Robards as Matthew South
Scott Hylands as David Appleton
Roy Jenson as Man in park
Mark Bramhall as Man in park

References

External links

1970 films
1970 romantic drama films
American romantic drama films
Films directed by Tom Gries
1970s English-language films
1970s American films